The North Pacific Longliners Association (NPLA) is a trade group that represents the largest longliners.

Fishing trade associations
Trade associations based in the United States